The fourth assembly of the Croatian Parliament was constituted on February 2, 2000 with mandates divided into 151 representatives after the January 3, 2000 elections.

Parliamentary officials

The president of the parliament (often also called the speaker in English) was Zlatko Tomčić (HSS).

Vice presidents of the parliament were:

Mato Arlović (SDP)
Baltazar Jalšovec (LIBRA)
Ivica Kostović (HDZ)
Vlatko Pavletić (HDZ)
Zdravko Tomac (SDP)

Representatives in the fifth assembly 

 Đurđa Adlešić
 Mato Arlović
 Zdenka Babić-Petričević
 Marija Bajt
 Branka Baletić
 Marko Baričević
 Luka Bebić
 Ante Beljo
 Snježana Biga Friganović
 Sanja Borovčak
 Viktor Brož
 Ivica Busonjić
 Dražen Budiša
 Zdravka Bušić
 Zlatko Canjuga
 Karmela Caparin
 Ivan Čehok
 Diana Čizmadija
 Zdenka Čunhil
 Ljubo Ćesić
 Lucija Debeljuh
 Đuro Dečak
 Mirjana Didović
 Željko Dragović
 Valter Drandić
 Anto Đapić (HSP)
 Milan Đukić
 Ivo Fabijanić
 Mirjana Ferić-Vac
 Goranko Fižulić
 Miroslav Furdek
 Krunoslav Gašparić
 Željko Glavan
 Branimir Glavaš
 Zrinjka Glovacki-Bernardi
 Mladen Godek
 Josip Golubić
 Karl Gorinšek
 Ante Grabovac
 Borislav Graljuk
 Mate Granić
 Zlatko Haramija
 Stjepan Henezi
 Vilim Herman
 Dubravka Horvat
 Nikola Ivaniš
 Baltazar Jalšovec
 Želimir Janjić
 Ivan Jarnjak
 Mate Jukić
 Vlado Jukić (HSP)
 Damir Jurić
 Marin Jurjević
 Damir Kajin
 Pavle Kalinić
 Božidar Kalmeta
 Boris Kandare (HSP, until 2001; replaced by Miroslav Rožić)
 Sanja Kapetanović
 Jadranka Katarinčić-Škrlj
 Slavko Kojić
 Ivan Kolar
 Joško Kontić
 Krunoslav Kordić
 Miroslav Korenika
 Jadranka Kosor
 Ivica Kostović
 Mario Kovač (politician)
 Milan Kovač
 Anto Kovačević (HKDU)
 Krešo Kovačićek
 Hrvoje Kraljević
 Zlatko Kramarić
 Željko Krapljan
 Drago Krpina
 Franjo Kučar
 Ljiljana Kuhta
 Ljubica Lalić
 Josip Leko
 Vedran Lendić
 Ivo Lončar
 Marija Lugarić
 Marijan Mačina
 Boris Mahač
 Željko Malević
 Ante Markov
 Marijan Maršić
 Zlatko Mateša
 Marina Matulović-Dropulić
 Romano Meštrović
 Jadranko Mijalić
 Ivan Milas
 Pavao Miljavac
 Ljerka Mintas-Hodak
 Dorica Nikolić
 Ivan Ninić
 Đuro Njavro
 Juraj Njavro
 Josip Odak
 Milanka Opačić
 Ivić Pašalić
 Josip Pavković
 Vlatko Pavletić
 Željko Pavlic
 Ivan Penić
 Dorotea Pešić-Bukovac
 Marijana Petir
 Velimir Pleša
 Vesna Podlipec
 Valter Poropat
 Vesna Pusić
 Jure Radić (engineer)
 Furio Radin
 Jozo Radoš
 Jadranka Reihl-Kir
 Luka Roić
 Miroslav Rožić (HSP, since 2001; he replaces Boris Kandare)
 Ivo Sanader
 Tibor Santo
 Katica Sedmak
 Josip Sesar
 Nenad Stazić
 Darko Šantić
 Vladimir Šeks
 Vladimir Šepčić
 Zlatko Šešelj
 Nevio Šetić
 Zlatko Šimatović
 Vesna Škare-Ožbolt
 Ivan Škarić
 Ivo Škrabalo
 Ivo Šlaus
 Ivan Štajduhar
 Dubravka Šuica
 Ivan Šuker
 Tonči Tadić (HSP)
 Ivica Tafra
 Zdravko Tomac
 Zlatko Tomčić
 Josip Torbar
 Luka Trconić
 Berislav Tušek
 Nikica Valentić
 Darijo Vasilić
 Zorko Vidiček
 Hrvoje Vojvoda
 Dragutin Vrus
 Dario Vukić
 Dragutin Vukušić
 Dragica Zgrebec
 Petar Žitnik
 Stjepan Živković
 Tonči Žuvela

External links
 Croatian Parliament

Lists of representatives in the modern Croatian Parliament by term